Hungarian literature is the body of written works primarily produced in Hungarian, and may also include works written in other languages (mostly Latin), either produced by Hungarians or having topics which are closely related to Hungarian culture. While it was less known in the English-speaking world for centuries, Hungary's literature gained renown in the 19th and 20th centuries, thanks to a new wave of internationally accessible writers like Mór Jókai, Antal Szerb, Sándor Márai, Imre Kertész and Magda Szabó.

Earliest writings in 10–14th century

The beginning of the history of Hungarian language as such (the proto-Hungarian period) is set at 1000 BC, when — according to current scientific understanding — the language had become differentiated from its closest relatives, the Ob-Ugric languages. No written evidence remains of the earliest Hungarian literature, but through folktales and folk songs, elements have survived that can be traced back to pagan times. Also extant, although only in Latin and dating from between the 11th and 14th centuries, are shortened versions of some Hungarian legends relating the origins of the Hungarian people and episodes from the conquest of Hungary and from campaigns of the 10th century.

In earliest times the Hungarian language was written in a runic-like script, although it was not used for literary purposes in the modern sense. The country switched to the Latin alphabet after being Christianized under the reign of Stephen I (1000–1038). There are no existing documents from the pre-11th century era. The Old Hungarian period is reckoned from 896 CE, when Hungarians conquered the Carpathian Basin, settled down and started to build their own state. Creation of the first extant written records followed soon after. The oldest written record in Hungarian is a fragment in the Establishing charter of the abbey of Tihany (1055) which contains several Hungarian terms, among them the words feheruuaru rea meneh hodu utu rea, ("up the military road to Fehérvár," referring to the place where the abbey was built). This text is probably to be read as Fehérü váru reá meneü hodu utu reá with today's spelling, and it would read as a Fehérvárra menő had[i] útra in today's Hungarian. The rest of the document was written in Latin.

The oldest complete, continuous text in Hungarian is Halotti beszéd és könyörgés, a short funeral oration written in about 1192–1195, moving in its simplicity. The oldest poem is Ómagyar Mária-siralom (the Lamentations of Mary), a free translation from Latin of a poem by Godefroy de Breteuil. It is also the oldest surviving Uralic poem. Both the funeral sermon and the Lamentations are hard to read and not quite comprehensible for modern-day Hungarians, mostly because the 26-letter Latin alphabet was not sufficient to represent all the sounds in Hungarian before diacritic marks and double letters were added.

During the Middle Ages and well into the Renaissance, the language of writing was mostly Latin. Important documents include the Admonitions of St. Stephen, which includes the king's admonitions to his son Prince Imre.

Among the first chronicles about Hungarian history were Gesta Hungarorum ("Deeds of the Hungarians"), by an unknown author, and Gesta Hunnorum et Hungarorum ("Deeds of the Huns and the Hungarians") by Simon Kézai. Both are in Latin. These chronicles mix history with legends, so historically they are not always authentic. Another chronicle is the Chronicon Pictum ("Illustrated Chronicle"), which was written for King Louis the Great by Mark of Kalt in 1358.

Further, Rogerius's 13th-century work was published with János Thuróczy's chronicle in the late 15th century. In Split (now a part of Croatia) Thomas of Spalato wrote on local history, with much information on Hungary in the 13th century. At that time Dalmatia and the city of Split were part of the Kingdom of Hungary.

Renaissance and Baroque 15-17th century

The 15th century saw the first translations from the Bible. Two Transylvanian preachers, Thomas and Valentine, followers of the Bohemian religious reformer Jan Hus, were responsible for this work, of which the prophetic books, the Psalms, and the Gospels have survived. A great part of the vocabulary created for the purpose is still in use.

Renaissance literature flourished under the reign of King Matthias (1458–1490). Janus Pannonius, although he wrote in Latin, counts as one of the most important persons in Hungarian literature, being the only significant Hungarian humanist poet of the period. The first printing house was also founded during Matthias's reign, by András Hess, in Buda. The first book printed in Hungary was the Chronica Hungarorum.

In 1526 most of Hungary fell under Ottoman occupation, from which date the beginning of the Middle Hungarian period is set, in connection with various cultural changes. The most important poets of the period were Bálint Balassi (1554–1594), Sebestyén Tinódi Lantos (c. 1510–1556) and Miklós Zrínyi (1620–1664). Balassi's poetry shows Mediaeval influences. His poems can be divided into three thematic categories: love poems, war poems and religious poems. Zrínyi's most significant work, Szigeti veszedelem ("Peril of Sziget", 1648/49) is an epic written in the style of the Iliad, and recounts the heroic Battle of Szigetvár, where his great-grandfather died while defending the castle of Szigetvár.

Translation of Roman authors produced also some works: János Baranyai Decsi translated Sallust's Catalina and Jughurta's war in the late 16th century. A decade later appeared the translation of Curtius Rufus's life of Alexander in Debrecen.

Historical works were even more numerous: the chronicle of Gáspár Heltai, published by him in Kolozsvár; Zay Ferenc's unpublished work on the siege of Belgrade from the 15th century; Kemény János's Transylvanian Dukes, and Miklós Bethlen's memoirs with János Szalárdy's voluminous then-unpublished work on Transylvanian history from Bethlen's reign to the 1660s; and Mihály Cserei's early 18th-century work are highlights of Hungarian-language literature. Another category is historical verses in Hungarian, like that of Sebestyén Tinódi Lantos from the 16th century, Péter Ilosvai Selymes, Mihály Szabatkai and Gergely Bornemissza.

Latin works in the period are more numerous. István Szamosközy, János Baranyai Decsi, Miklós Istvánffy, János Bethlen, and Farkas Bethlen, Ferenc Forgách, György Szerémi, Ambrus Somogyi, Gianmichele Bruto and Oláh Miklós are the most important authors of historical works from the 16th to 17th century. In German Georg Kraus and Georg Zeiler wrote on Transylvanian history. In Spanish one may read Bernardo de Aldana's apology for the 1552 loss of the castle of Lippa to the Turks.

Among religious literary works the most important is the Bible translation by Gáspár Károli, the Protestant pastor of Gönc, in 1590. The translation is called the Bible of Vizsoly, after the town where it was first published. Another important religious work is the Legend of Saint Margaret, copied by Lea Ráskai around 1510 from an earlier work that did not survive.

Enlightenment and the language reform

The Hungarian enlightenment arrived, via Vienna, about fifty years after the Western European enlightenment. The first Enlightenment writers were Maria Theresia's bodyguards (György Bessenyei, János Batsányi and so on). The greatest poets of the time were Mihály Csokonai Vitéz and Dániel Berzsenyi.

The most prominent figure of Hungarian language reform was Ferenc Kazinczy, who helped make the Hungarian language feasible for scientific explanations; furthermore, a lot of new words were coined for describing new inventions (for example, mozdony, which means 'locomotive.' Previously the loan word lokomotív had been used.)

Gallery

See also
List of Hungarian writers

References

External links

General
 A History of Hungarian Literature (From the Earliest Times to the mid-1970s) by Lóránt Czigány
 Albert Tezla: Hungarian authors – A bibliographical handbook
 An overview of Hungarian literature by Daniel Abondolo
 A briefer view of the previous source
 Hungarian literature
 Hungarian Literature Online
 The Hungarian Electronic Library
 Magyar poetry
 Poetry of the Magyars
 Selected bibliographies of important Hungarian authors
 Writing for the ages: Prose & Poetry from 20th Century Hungary (Hungarian Books and Translations Office – PIM, 2014)
 Database for translations of Hungarian literary works
 Magyar poems (corrected text version), Scanned page images with uncorrected OCR'd text

Specific sources
 Funeral Oration and Prayer
 Sermon above the grave or the Funeral Oration
 Hungarian poems in English

Literary chapters from the Encyclopaedia Humana Hungarica (1–5)
 The Remains of Oral Tradition; The Beginning of Literacy (from the beginnings till 1038)
 The External Conditions of Literature; The Characteristics of the Contents of Literature; The Authors; The Works (1038-1301)
 The Level of Education; Authors, Genres, Works (1301-1437)
 Hungarian Literature; Latin Literature; Humanist Literature (1437-1526)
 Hungarian Literature; Turkish Literature (1526-1699)
 (The English translation of volumes 6 to 9 are in preparation.)